Shaun Mark Pearson (born 28 April 1989) is an English professional footballer who plays as a centre-back for EFL League Two side Grimsby Town.

Pearson began his career at Spalding United in 2006 before moving to Stamford in 2008. A year later he moved up the football pyramid again by signing for Boston United where he enjoyed two seasons, earning promotion to the Conference North. In the summer of 2011 he joined Grimsby Town where he has picked up two Lincolnshire Senior Cup honours and a runners-up medal in the 2013 FA Trophy Final as well as earning promotion to the Football League before joining Wrexham in 2017. In 2011, he was also capped by the England C team.

Club career

Early career
Pearson was born in York, North Yorkshire and attended Woodthorpe Primary School, before moving to Norfolk with his family aged 11. He began his career with United Counties Football League side Spalding United. His appearances during the 2007–08 season earned him the Supporters Player of the Season award, which captured the attention of local rivals Stamford. In his only season with The Daniels he went on to clinch a similar award to the one he had achieved with Spalding the previous season.

Boston United
In the summer of 2009, Pearson made a second move in two seasons by joining Northern Premier League Premier Division side Boston United on 8 July 2009. Pearson became one of the club's favoured centre halves in the plans of management duo Rob Scott and Paul Hurst. At the end of the season Pearson and Boston earned promotion to the Conference North division after beating Bradford Park Avenue in the play-off final. During the course of the 2010–11 season United's management duo had departed to take over from Neil Woods at Grimsby Town and speculation mounted that Pearson would be joining his former mentors at Blundell Park, Pearson was quick to quash the rumours saying that although he wanted to become a professional footballer he wanted to do it with Boston and was hopeful he could aid the club's promotion bid to the Conference Premier. The rumour had also unsettled Boston chairman David Newton who said his main aim was to keep Pearson at York Street following two outstanding seasons. After failing to earn promotion with United, Pearson admitted he could be about to join Scott and Hurst at Grimsby. His time at Boston brought 17 goals in 67 league appearances, Pearson was also handed the Supporters Player of the Season award in both of his seasons at York Street.

Grimsby Town

2011–12
On 27 June 2011 Grimsby made an official bid for Pearson that was rejected by Boston for being "way too low" under what the club had wanted for the player. Eventually Pearson became a Grimsby player with The Mariners also recruiting fellow Boston player Anthony Church. Both moves caused issues between the two clubs and a court tribunal had to be set in November 2011 to settle the compensation Grimsby would have to pay Boston for both players. No sooner than a month into his career at Grimsby, he had fetched his first trophy for the club in helping Town lift the Lincolnshire Senior Cup after beating Lincoln City at Sincil Bank. Pearson made his professional debut for The Mariners in a 5–0 defeat against Braintree Town. He would wait until 20 March 2012 before he finally netted his first goal for The Mariners in a 2–1 victory away at Hayes & Yeading United. Pearson's goal turned out to be the winner as he scored a "thumping header" from a Peter Winn cross in the 56th minute. On 9 April 2012 Pearson scored both goals in a 2–0 win over Gateshead, the first a header and the second he managed to turn the ball over the line after his initial header had been cleared off the line. He ended the season having scored 3 goals in 33 appearances.

2012–13
Pearson continued his form and run in the team initially partnering Fleetwood Town loanee Nathan Pond for the first half of the 2012–13 season. The club had already defended the Lincolnshire Senior Cup by yet again beating local rivals Lincoln City on a penalty shootout at Sincil Bank. The new season for The Mariners saw them race ahead in the league with Wrexham and Newport County. His first goal of the season came on 1 September 2012 in a 2–0 win away at Hereford United. The club also went on a healthy run in the FA Trophy and after defeating Dartford over two legs in the semi-final they met Wrexham in the final at Wembley Stadium, but even with Pearson shaking off an injury to play, Town suffered a 4–1 defeat on penalties after the game had ended 1–1 after normal time. Pearson scored his second goal of the season on 3 April 2013 in a 3–1 win over Macclesfield Town, the win help aided Town's promotion push, that was eventually halted when they lost over two legs to Newport County in the play-off semi finals.

2013–14
Ahead of the 2013–14 season Pearson put pen to paper on a new one-year contract, with the player saying Blundell Park was the best place to be for his development.

2014–15
He played in the 2015 Conference Premier play-off Final against Bristol Rovers at Wembley on 17 May 2015; following a 1–1 draw after extra time, Grimsby lost 5–3 in a penalty shoot-out.

2015–16
Ahead of the 2015–16 season, having made 146 league appearances for the club, Pearson put pen to paper on a new two-year contract. A number of sides were chasing his signature, Pearson said: "I COULD have gone elsewhere for more money, but I've loved every minute of my time here and I couldn't see myself anywhere else."

Pearson played in Grimsby's 3–1 victory over Forest Green Rovers in the 2016 National League play-off Final at Wembley, seeing Grimsby promoted to League Two after a six-year absence from the Football League.

2016–17
He made his League Two debut with the club on 6 August 2016 in the opening game of the 2016–17 season in Grimsby's 2–0 home victory against Morecambe. Pearson was named in the English Football League Team of the Week for the month of January 2017, with his impressive performance against Hartlepool United.

After making 38 appearances and scoring two goals for Grimsby in the 2016–17 season he was released by the club on 18 May 2017.

Wrexham 
On 19 May 2017, Pearson signed for National League side Wrexham on a two-year contract.

During the COVID-19 pandemic, all of Wrexham's players were furloughed and Pearson worked as a pizza delivery driver and night shifts at Tesco.

Return to Grimsby Town 
On 4 June 2021, Pearson re-signed for National League side Grimsby Town  on a two year contract. 

Grimsby secured promotion with victory in the play-off final, though Pearson was an unused substitute at London Stadium.

On 2 December 2022, Pearson rejoined former club Boston United on a one-month loan.

International career
In August 2011 Pearson and Town teammate Charlie I'Anson were called up to the England C team to face the India Under-23's team.

Personal life
Pearson is a supporter of his hometown club York City.

It was announced that Pearson would represent former club Wrexham in The Soccer Tournament, a seven-a-side football tournament in North Carolina between 1 and 2 June 2023, with the winning team looking to win a $1 million prize. Pearson is due to feature alongside Wrexham owners and Hollywood actors Ryan Reynolds and Rob McElhenney as well as former team mates Paul Rutherford, Mark Carrington and David Jones. Reynolds announced that if his team are successfully the money would be donated to local projects in Wrexham.

Honours

Player

Boston United
Northern Premier League Premier Division play-offs: 2009–10
Lincolnshire Senior Cup: 2009–10

Grimsby Town
National League play-offs: 2015–16, 2021–22; runner-up 2014–15
FA Trophy runner-up: 2012–13, 2015–16
Lincolnshire Senior Cup: 2011–12, 2012–13, 2014–15

Individual
Conference Premier Team of the Year: 2013–14, 2014–15
National League Team of the Year: 2017–18, 2018–19
Spalding United Supporters Player of the Season: 2007–08
Stamford Supporters Player of the Season: 2008–09
Boston United Supporters Player of the Season: 2009–10, 2010–11
Wrexham Player of the Year: 2017–18

Career statistics

References

External links
Shaun Pearson profile at the Grimsby Town F.C. website

1989 births
Living people
Footballers from York
English footballers
England semi-pro international footballers
Association football defenders
Spalding United F.C. players
Stamford A.F.C. players
Boston United F.C. players
Grimsby Town F.C. players
Wrexham A.F.C. players
Northern Premier League players
National League (English football) players
English Football League players